The Roman Catholic Archdiocese of Dar-es-Salaam is a Latin Metropolitan archdiocese of the Roman Catholic Church in Tanzania.

The archdiocese's motherchurch and seat of its archbishop is St. Joseph's Cathedral. The Archdiocese has been led by Archbishop Jude Thaddaeus Ruwa'ichi since 15 August 2019.

History 
 It was erected as the Apostolic Prefecture of Southern Zanguebar by Pope Leo XIII on November 16, 1897, on territory split off from the then Apostolic Vicariate of Zanguebar. 
 It was promoted to Apostolic Vicariate of Southern Zanguebar on September 15, 1902. It was renamed by Pope Pius X as the Apostolic Vicariate of Dar-es-Salaam on August 10, 1906.
 Lost territories on November 12, 1913 to establish the Apostolic Prefecture of Lindi and again on March 3, 1922 to establish the Apostolic Prefecture of Iringa
 Promoted to Metropolitan Archdiocese by Pope Pius XII on March 25, 1953
 Lost territories on April 21, 1964 to establish Diocese of Mahenge and again on December 12, 1964 to establish the then Apostolic Administration of Zanzibar and Pemba (now Diocese of Zanzibar, both its suffragans
 It enjoyed a papal visit from Pope John Paul II in September 1990.

Province 
Its ecclesiastical province comprises the Metropolitan's own archdiocese and the following suffragan bishoprics:
 Roman Catholic Diocese of Ifakara
 Roman Catholic Diocese of Mahenge
 Roman Catholic Diocese of Morogoro
 Roman Catholic Diocese of Tanga
 Roman Catholic Diocese of Zanzibar.

Bishops

Ordinaries

Apostolic Prefects of Southern Zanguebar
 Bonifatius Fleschutz, O.S.B. (1887-1891)
 Maurus Hartmann, O.S.B. (1894-1902)

Apostolic Vicar of Southern Zanguebar
 Cassian Spiß, O.S.B. (1902-1905)

Apostolic Vicars of Dar-es-Salaam
 Thomas Spreiter, O.S.B. (1906-1920), appointed Apostolic Vicar of Natal and later Apostolic Vicar of Eshowe
 Joseph Gabriel Zelger, O.F.M. Cap. (1923-1929)
 Edgar Aristide Maranta, O.F.M. Cap. (1930-1953); see below

Archbishops of Dar-es-Salaam
 Edgard Aristide Maranta, O.F.M. Cap. (1953-1968); see above
 Cardinal Laurean Rugambwa (1968-1992)
 Polycarp Pengo (1992-2019, Coadjutor 1990-1992) (Cardinal in 1998)
 Jude Thaddaeus Ruwa'ichi (2019–present, Coadjutor 2018–2020)

Coadjutor Archbishops
 Polycarp Pengo (1990-1992); future Cardinal
 Jude Thaddaeus Ruwa'ichi (2018–2019)

Auxiliary Bishops
Method Kilaini (1999-2009), appointed auxiliary bishop of Bukoba
Salutaris Melchior Libena (2010-2012), appointed Bishop of Ifakara
Elias Mchonde (1956-1964), appointed Bishop of Mahenge
Titus Joseph Mdoe (2013-2015), appointed Bishop of Mtwara 
Eusebius Alfred Nzigilwa (2010-2020), appointed Bishop of Mpanda

See also 
 Roman Catholicism in Tanzania

References

External links

 Catholic-Hierarchy
 GCatholic.org, with incumbent biography links

Dar es Salaam
Religious organizations established in 1887
Roman Catholic dioceses in Tanzania
Roman Catholic dioceses and prelatures established in the 19th century
 
 
Roman Catholic ecclesiastical provinces in Tanzania
1887 establishments in German East Africa